Michael Serbinis (born 28 October 1973) is a Canadian entrepreneur, engineer and angel investor based in Toronto, Ontario, Canada.

While a student, Serbinis worked for Microsoft on advanced routing algorithms. Early in his career he then worked alongside Elon Musk at Zip2.

He later helped found the cloud-based document storage network company DocSpace. In December 2009, Serbinis co-founded Kobo Inc., a digital reading company. In 2014, Serbinis launched League, a digital health and wellness benefits platform. Along with being a co-founder, he also serves as Chief Executive Officer.

Early life and education
Serbinis was born in Hamilton, Ontario. While in high school Serbinis designed a high-temperature superconductor propulsion system that won Gold at the Intel International Science and Engineering Fair. That achievement would eventually lead him to opportunities to work with NASA, Rockwell Aerospace and Intel.

Serbinis attended Queen's University at Kingston and graduated with a Bachelor of Science degree. While there, his research focused around quantum cryptography. He also has a Masters of Science in industrial engineering from the University of Toronto, where he researched neural networks and the use of artificial intelligence to price loans dynamically.

Career 
At age 19, Serbinis entered the Ontario Engineering Competition. His entry in the competition was a frictionless motor operated by a new generation of software code that mimicked genetic coding. Because the software constantly evolved, the motor was able to hover effortlessly above a magnetic bearing without crashing. One of the judges, Ken Nickerson, who was an executive at Microsoft at the time decided to give Serbinis a summer job with the company.

Zip2 and Kobo 
Serbinis worked alongside Elon Musk at Zip2. Zip2 primarily provided and licensed online city guide software to newspapers. It was eventually sold to Altavista for $300 million.

Serbinis then helped found a cloud-based document storage network company called DocSpace. Two years after DocSpace was launched, San Francisco-based Critical Path Inc. agreed to acquire it for $530 million.

In 2001, Serbinis was appointed Chief Technology Officer of Critical Path.

In 2009, Serbinis co-founded Kobo Inc., a digital reading company. In January 2012, Kobo was acquired by Japanese e-commerce conglomerate Rakuten for $315 million. By 2014, Kobo had over 18 million users in 193 countries.

League Inc. 
In 2014 Serbinis launched League Inc., a digital health and wellness platform. Along with being a co-founder, Serbinis also serves as Chief Executive Officer and Chairman. In 2016, League raised a US$25 million Series A. In June 2017, League expanded its platform into the US. In July 2018, League raised a US$41.7 million Series B.

Perimeter Institute 
In 2021 when Mike Lazaridis stepped down from his role as chairman of the board of the Perimeter Institute for Theoretical Physics in Waterloo, Ontario, Serbinis (a long-time existing member of the board) became the chair.

Personal life 
Serbinis lives in Toronto with his family.

References

External links
 

1973 births
Businesspeople in online retailing
Businesspeople from Ontario
Canadian people of Greek descent
Canadian technology chief executives
Chief information officers
Chief technology officers
Indigo Books and Music people
Kobo Inc.
Living people
People from Hamilton, Ontario
Queen's University at Kingston alumni
Rakuten
University of Toronto alumni